On 7 January 1972, Iberia Flight 602 crashed into a mountain near Ibiza Town, Spain. The Sud Aviation SE 210 Caravelle operating the flight had taken off from Valencia Airport in Valencia, Spain, destined for Ibiza Airport on the Balearic island of Ibiza. All 98 passengers and 6 crew died in the crash.

Aircraft and crew 
The aircraft was a Sud Aviation SE 210 Caravelle that first flew on 25 June 1963 and was powered by two Rolls-Royce RA-29 Mk.533R Avon turbojet engines. Delivered to Iberia on 9 July, the aircraft was initially named Tomás Luis de Victoria after the Spanish Composer of the same name, though this was later shortened to Maestro Victoria.

Flight 602 was under the command of 37-year-old captain José Luis Ballester Sepúlveda, with 7,000 flying hours' experience, first officer Jesús Montesinos Sánchez, and flight engineer Vicente Rodríguez Mesa.

The crash 
Flight 602 was a domestic service flight that took off from Valencia Airport bound for Ibiza. On board were 6 crew and 98 passengers, most of whom were Valencia natives returning to Ibiza for work after the holidays.

Ibiza Airport sources reported that he also said, "Get me a beer ready, we are here."

The aircraft was approaching Runway 07 when it descended below . Reportedly, neither the captain nor the co-pilot noticed the dangerous descent, as they were discussing a football match with the airport tower controller. The aircraft exploded on impact. All 98 passengers and 6 crew on board were killed.

Cause 
It was ruled that the pilot had failed to maintain the minimum flight altitude for a visual approach to Runway 07.

References

External links


Aviation accidents and incidents in Spain
Transport in Ibiza
1972 in Spain
Aviation accidents and incidents in 1972
Airliner accidents and incidents involving controlled flight into terrain
Airliner accidents and incidents caused by pilot error
Accidents and incidents involving the Sud Aviation Caravelle
Iberia (airline) accidents and incidents
January 1972 events in Europe